Adolf Frederick I (15 December 1588 – 27 February 1658) was the reigning Duke of Mecklenburg-Schwerin from his father's death in 1592 until 1628 and again from 1631 to 1658. Between 1634 and 1648 Adolf Frederick also ruled the Prince-Bishopric of Schwerin as its administrator.

Early life
He was a son of John VII, Duke of Mecklenburg-Schwerin and Sophia, daughter of Adolf, Duke of Holstein-Gottorp, and his wife Christine of Hesse.

At first, Adolf Frederick and his brother John Albert II reigned under the guardianship of Duke Ulrich III of Mecklenburg-Güstrow and Charles I of Mecklenburg (his father's uncles).  The two brothers Adolf Frederick and John Albert, took over governance of Mecklenburg-Schwerin beginning on 16 April 1608.  After the death of Charles on 22 July 1610 they also governed in Mecklenburg-Güstrow.

Division of Mecklenburg and Thirty Years' War
In 1621 the duchy of Mecklenburg was formally divided between the two brothers, Adolf Frederick ruling in Mecklenburg-Schwerin and John Albert ruling in Mecklenburg-Güstrow.  During the Thirty Years' War, Albrecht von Wallenstein ousted the dukes after they secretly sided with King Christian IV of Denmark against Holy Roman Emperor Ferdinand II.  Wallenstein ruled the duchies from 1627 until 1631, when the Swedes restored the under King Gustavus Adolphus.  In 1634 Adolf Frederick succeeded Ulrik of Denmark as the last Administrator of the Prince-Bishopric of Schwerin before its secularisation.

Marriages and children

Adolf Frederick I fathered 19 children in all.

He was married for the first time on 4 September 1622 to Anna Maria of Ostfriesland (1601–1634), daughter of Count Enno III of East Frisia and Anna of Schleswig-Holstein-Gottorp. They had the following children:

Christian Louis I (Schwerin, 11 December 1623 – Den Haag, 21 June 1692), Duke of Mecklenburg-Schwerin.
Sophie Agnes (Schwerin, 11 January 1625 – Rühn, 26 December 1694), Abbess of Rühn (1654).
Charles (Schwerin, 8 March 1626 – Mirow, 20 August 1670), Duke of Mecklenburg-Mirow.
Anna Maria (Schwerin, 1 July 1627 – Halle a.d.Saale, 11 December 1669), married in 1647 to August, Duke of Saxe-Weissenfels.
John George (Lichtenburg, 5 May 1629 – Mirow, 9 July 1675), Duke of Mecklenburg-Mirow.
Hedwig (Lübeck, 11 August 1630 – Lübz, 17 May 1631).
Gustav Rudolph (Schwerin, 26 February 1632 – Tempzin, 14 May 1670), married Erdmuthe Sophie (1644–1689), daughter of Duke Francis Henry of Saxe-Lauenburg.
Juliane (Schwerin, 8 November 1633 – Schwerin, 3 February 1634).

Adolf Frederick married for a second time in 1635 to Marie Katharina (1616–1665), daughter of Duke Julius Ernest, Duke of Brunswick-Dannenberg, and Maria of East Frisia (1582–1616). They had the following children:

Juliane Sibylla (Schwerin, 16 February 1636 – Rühn, 2 October 1701), Abbess of Rühn (9 March 1695).
Frederick I (Schwerin, 13 February 1638 – Schloss Grabow, 28 April 1688), Duke of Mecklenburg-Grabow.
Christina (Schwerin, 8 August 1639 – Gandersheim, 30 June 1693), Abbess of Gandersheim (1681).
Bernhard Sigismund (Schwerin, 21 January 1641 – Schwerin, 15 November 1641).
Augusta (Schwerin, 24 September 1643 – Schwerin, 5 May 1644).
Maria Elisabeth (Schwerin, 24 March 1646 – Gandersheim, 27 April 1713), Abbess of Rühn (1705), Abbess of Gandersheim (1712).
Anna Sophia (Schwerin, 24 November 1647 – Juliusburg, 13 August 1723), married in 1677 to Julius Siegmund, Duke of Württemberg-Juliusburg.
Adolph Ernest (Schwerin, 22 November 1650 – Schwerin, 13 January 1651).
Philipp Louis (Schwerin, 30 May 1652 – Schwerin, 20 October 1655).
Henry William (Schwerin, 6 June 1653 – Schwerin, 2 December 1653).
Adolf Frederick II (posthumously Grabow, 19 October 1658 – 12 May 1708), Duke of Mecklenburg-Strelitz.

|-

Dukes of Mecklenburg-Schwerin
House of Mecklenburg-Schwerin
Lutheran Prince-Bishops of Schwerin
1588 births
1658 deaths